Roy Argel Gómez Olguín (born 24 October 1973) is a Mexican politician affiliated with the PRI. He currently serves as Deputy of the LXII Legislature of the Mexican Congress representing Nayarit.

References

1973 births
Living people
Politicians from Tepic, Nayarit
Institutional Revolutionary Party politicians
21st-century Mexican politicians
Deputies of the LXII Legislature of Mexico
Members of the Chamber of Deputies (Mexico) for Nayarit